Municipal elections were held in the city of Westmount, Quebec, Canada on 3 November 2013 as part of the 2013 Quebec municipal elections. Voters elected 8 positions on the Westmount City Council, as well as one mayor. On 4 October, Mayor Peter Trent, as well as councillors Nicole Forbes and Victor Drury were acclaimed. 

Councillors Tim Price of District 2 and Gary Ikeman of District 5 will not be seeking another term on council.

Election Notes

Twenty-five-year-old Philip A. Cutler became the youngest city council member in Westmount's History. Cynthia Lulham was elected for a 6th term, making her the longest serving council member. It was the second consecutive term that Mayor Peter Trent was elected by acclamation. The same is true for District 3 councillor Victor Drury. The majority, 5 of 8 seats, on council will be made up of women.

Mayor

Westmount City Council Candidates

District 1

District 2

District 3

District 4

District 5

District 6

District 7

District 8

References

Westmount, Quebec
2013 Quebec municipal elections